D34 may refer to:

 Akaflieg Darmstadt D-34, a German sailplane
 BHP Port Kembla D34 class, a class of diesel locomotives
 , a Mato Grosso-class destroyer of the Brazilian Navy
 D34 road (Croatia)
 , a D-class destroyer of the Royal Navy
 , a V-class destroyer of the Royal Navy
 LNER Class D34, a class of British steam locomotives
 Tarrasch Defense, a chess opening
 d34, a die with 34 sides